Sian Christina MacLeod  (born 31 May 1962) is a British diplomat who was formerly head of the UK delegation to the Organization for Security and Co-operation in Europe (OSCE) in Vienna. She is now the British Ambassador to Serbia.

Career
MacLeod graduated from the Royal Academy of Music with a BMus degree in 1983. She joined the Foreign and Commonwealth Office (FCO) in 1986 and served in Moscow 1988–92. After the collapse of the Soviet Union she served briefly as deputy head of mission in Vilnius, Lithuania, in 1992. She then returned to the FCO until she was posted to The Hague 1996–2000. She was sent back to Moscow 2004–07, first as political counsellor and then as minister and deputy head of mission. She was ambassador to the Czech Republic 2009–13 and was appointed to be head of the UK delegation to the OSCE in 2015 (with the rank of ambassador). In January 2019 she was appointed to be ambassador to the Republic of Serbia from summer 2019.

MacLeod was appointed OBE in 2002 "in recognition of services in support of operations in Afghanistan during the period 1st October 2001 to 31st March 2002".

References

1962 births
Living people
Alumni of the Royal Academy of Music
Ambassadors of the United Kingdom to the Czech Republic
Organization for Security and Co-operation in Europe
Officers of the Order of the British Empire
British women ambassadors
Ambassadors of the United Kingdom to Serbia